The 2014–15 season of the Belgian Second Division (also known as Belgacom League for sponsorship reasons) began on 1 August 2014 and ended on 26 April 2015.

Team changes
After promotion and relegation, only 12 teams of the previous season remained in the league, with 6 others being replaced:

Out
 Westerlo were promoted as champions of the previous season.
 Mouscron-Péruwelz were promoted after winning the promotion playoffs.
 Visé were relegated to the Third Division after finishing 18th.
 Hoogstraten were relegated to the Third Division after losing the relegation playoffs.
 RWDM Brussels folded as a team.
 Boussu Dour Borinage were in financial trouble and sold their football license to Seraing United. Boussu Dour was renamed Francs Borains and themselves bought the license of a team playing in the Belgian Fourth Division.

In
 OH Leuven were relegated from the Belgian Pro League after finishing 15th.
 Mons were relegated from the Belgian Pro League after finishing 16th.
 KRC Mechelen were promoted as champions from Third Division A.
 Woluwe-Zaventem were promoted as champions from Third Division B.
 Patro Eisden Maasmechelen were promoted after winning the third division playoffs.
 Seraing United, a club from the Belgian Provincial leagues, bought the license of Boussu Dour Borinage and thereby took over its place.

Team information

Regular season

League table

Period winners
Like before, the season was divided into three periods. The first ten matchdays together form the first period, matchdays 11 to 22 form period two and the last 12 form period three. The three period winners take part in the Belgian Second Division play-offs together with the winner of the 2014–15 Belgian Pro League relegation playoff. The winner of this final round gets to play in the 2015–16 Belgian Pro League.

During the tenth matchday on 5 October 2014, Oud-Heverlee Leuven won the first period and thereby was the first to qualify for the final round. They were joined by Sint-Truiden, who clinched the second period during matchday 21 on 21 December 2014, by obtaining a five-point lead with only one match to go. Lommel United clinched the third period title on the final matchday, as they lost to Sint-Truiden but Eupen came three goals short of overtaking them on goal difference. Eupen did however get to take part in the Belgian Second Division play-offs as Sint-Truiden were already promoted by virtue of winning the title.

Period 1

Period 2

Period 3

Results

Season statistics

Top scorers
Sources: Soccerway
Belgian Second Division

Up to and including matches played on 26 April 2015.

12 goals (2 players)

  Hilaire Momi (Sint-Truiden)
  William Owusu (Antwerp)

11 goals (4 players)

  Axel Bossekota (ASV Geel)
  Harlem Gnohéré (Mons)
  Olivier Myny (Roeselare)
  Ivan Yagan (KRC Mechelen)

9 goals (3 players)

  Jovan Kostovski (OH Leuven)
  Piotr Parzyszek (Sint-Truiden)
  Ratko Vansimpsen (Aalst)

7 goals (5 players)

  Daniel Oliveira (Aalst)
  Donjet Shkodra (Aalst)
  Christophe Martín-Suárez (Patro Eisden Maasmechelen)
  Joeri Dequevy (Sint-Truiden)
  Lonsana Doumbouya (Tubize)

6 goals (7 players)

  Gianni De Neve (Aalst)
  Loris Brogno (Mons)
  Yannick Loemba (Mons)
  Alexis Lafon (Virton)
  Raoul Ngadrira (Virton)
  Anthony Lorenzon (Woluwe-Zaventem)
  Maurice Weynants (Woluwe-Zaventem)

5 goals (11 players)

  Wesley Vanbelle (Aalst)
  Zico Gielis (ASV Geel)
  Prince Asubonteng (Dessel Sport)
  Samuel Asamoah (Eupen)
  Rodrí (Eupen)
  Bart Webers (Heist)
  Frédéric Farin (KRC Mechelen)
  Wouter Scheelen (Lommel United)
  Roman Ferber (Mons)
  David Vandenbroeck (OH Leuven)
  Davy Sroka (Patro Eisden Maasmechelen)

4 goals (16 players)

  Seïd Khiter (Antwerp)
  Kenneth Kerckhofs (ASV Geel)
  Stein Huysegems (Dessel Sport)
  Ronnie Reniers (Dessel Sport)
  Michael Lallemand (Eupen)
  Jaime Alfonso Ruiz (Heist)
  David Wijns (Heist)
  Alessandro Cerigioni (OH Leuven)
  Ibrahim Somé (OH Leuven)
  Rik Impens (Roeselare)
  Kennedy Nwanganga (Roeselare)
  Yaya Boumediene (Seraing United)
  Mathias Schils (Sint-Truiden)
  Mehdi Fennouche (Tubize)
  Mamadou Fall (WS Brussels)
  Moussa Traoré (WS Brussels)

3 goals (29 players)

  Joren Dom (Antwerp)
  Yannis Augustijnen (ASV Geel)
  Omar Bennassar (Dessel Sport)
  Jari Breugelmans (Dessel Sport)
  Hans Hannes (Dessel Sport)
  Luis García (Eupen)
  Geoffry Hairemans (Heist)
  Jonas Vandermarliere (Heist)
  Toon Lenaerts (Lommel United)
  Lucas Schoofs (Lommel United)
  Andrei (Mons)
  Megan Laurent (Mons)
  Yohan Brouckaert (OH Leuven)
  Yohan Croizet (OH Leuven)
  Alessio Allegria (Patro Eisden Maasmechelen)
  Martijn Stefani (Patro Eisden Maasmechelen)
  Jimmy De Jonghe (Roeselare)
  Stevy Okitokandjo (Roeselare)
  Lilian Bochet (Seraing United)
  Mickaël Tirpan (Seraing United)
  Yvan Erichot (Sint-Truiden)
  Sascha Kotysch (Sint-Truiden)
  Mehdi Lazaar (Sint-Truiden)
  Leandro Bailly (Tubize)
  Amara Diané (Tubize)
  Hwang Jin-sung (Tubize)
  Mayron De Almaida (Virton)
  Dorian Dessoleil (Virton)
  Amady Diop (WS Brussels)

2 goals (35 players)

  Johanna Omolo (Antwerp)
  Timo Cauwenberg (ASV Geel)
  Jo Christiaens (ASV Geel)
  Ben Santermans (ASV Geel)
  Marijn Steurs (ASV Geel)
  Jasper Van Der Heyden (ASV Geel)
  Wolke Janssens (Dessel Sport)
  Akram Afif (Eupen)
  Guy Dufour (Eupen)
  Erivelton (KRC Mechelen)
  Jason Adesanya (Lommel United)
  Thomas Jutten (Lommel United)
  Glenn Neven (Lommel United)
  Georgios Kaminiaris (Mons)
  Marco Battista (Patro Eisden Maasmechelen)
  Ruben Janssen (Patro Eisden Maasmechelen)
  Taner Taktak (Patro Eisden Maasmechelen)
  Thomas Azevedo (OH Leuven)
  Kjetil Borry (Roeselare)
  Marcos Camozzato (Roeselare)
  Tom Raes (Roeselare)
  Jari Vandeputte (Roeselare)
  Moussa Gueye (Seraing United)
  Pierre Baherlé (Sint-Truiden)
  Edmilson (Sint-Truiden)
  Gaëtan Hendrickx (Sint-Truiden)
  Rob Schoofs (Sint-Truiden)
  Fabien Antunes (Virton)
  Valentin Focki (Virton)
  Grégory Molnar (Virton)
  Stef Van den Heuvel (Woulwe-Zaventem)
  Jente Van Ongeval (Woulwe-Zaventem)
  Amadou Diallo (WS Brussels)
  Grégory Grisez (WS Brussels)
  Ilias Maatoug (WS Brussels)

1 goal (83 players)

  Jonas Bogaerts (Aalst)
  Tjendo De Cuyper (Aalst)
  Kevin Janssens (Aalst)
  Philippe Janssens (Aalst)
  Elis Koulibaly (Aalst)
  Jonas De Roeck (Antwerp)
  Anthony Di Lallo (Antwerp)
  Jannes Vansteenkiste (Antwerp)
  Kevin Tano (Antwerp)
  Geert Berben (ASV Geel)
  Onyeka Onwuekelu (ASV Geel)
  Lens Annab (ASV Geel)
  Wout Bastiaens (Dessel Sport)
  Roy Meeus (Dessel Sport)
  Kurt Remen (Dessel Sport)
  Kevin Tapoko (Dessel Sport)
  Nick Van Belle (Dessel Sport)
  Wouter Vosters (Dessel Sport)
  Stephen Babalola (Eupen)
  Anthony Bassey (Eupen)
  Cor Gillis (Heist)
  Tarik Dahman (Heist)
  Andreas Luckermans (Heist)
  Michel Nkuman (Heist)
  Yannick Rymenants (Heist)
  Jeroen Vanderputte (Heist)
  Seppe Brulmans (KRC Mechelen)
  Daan Debouver (KRC Mechelen)
  Rachid Hmouda (KRC Mechelen)
  Bert Tuteleers (KRC Mechelen)
  Daan Vaesen (KRC Mechelen)
  Ken Debauve (Lommel United)
  Bart Goossens (Lommel United)
  Yassin Gueroui (Lommel United)
  Jelle Rykx (Lommel United)
  Sam Vanaken (Lommel United)
  Sami Lkoutbi (Mons)
  Mahamoudou Kéré (Mons)
  Jérémy Sapina (Mons)
  Jean-Christophe Vergerolle (Mons)
  Simon Bracke (OH Leuven)
  Nicolas Delporte (OH Leuven)
  Romain Reynaud (OH Leuven)
  Giuseppe Rossini (OH Leuven)
  Ben Yagan (OH Leuven)
  Kenneth Van Goethem (OH Leuven)
  Samir Bouhriss (Patro Eisden Maasmechelen)
  Sébastien Gonzatti (Patro Eisden Maasmechelen)
  Koen Hustinx (Patro Eisden Maasmechelen)
  Jean-François Mbuba (Roeselare)
  Mickael Seoudi (Roeselare)
  Jeroen Vanthournout (Roeselare)
  Petar Bojović (Seraing United)
  Alessandro Iandoli (Sint-Truiden)
  Faycal Rherras (Sint-Truiden)
  Pierre Gevaert (Tubize)
  Quentin Laurent (Tubize)
  Philippe Liard (Tubize)
  Sofiane Kheyari (Tubize)
  Lou Wallaert (Tubize)
  Nicolas Day (Virton)
  Djaïd Kasri (Virton)
  Arsène Menessou (Virton)
  Mohamed Mrabet (Virton)
  Dylan Suray (Virton)
  Johan Caurant (Woluwe-Zaventem)
  Julien Charlier (Woluwe-Zaventem)
  Joren Dehond (Woluwe-Zaventem)
  Denis Dessaer (Woluwe-Zaventem)
  Axel Dheur (Woluwe-Zaventem)
  Nehemie Muzembo (Woluwe-Zaventem)
  Ugo Nwadikwa (Woluwe-Zaventem)
  Dylan Vanwelkenhuysen (Woluwe-Zaventem)
  Issa Baradji (WS Brussels)
  Habib Bellaïd (WS Brussels)
  Mehdi Courgnaud (WS Brussels)
  Wilfried Dalmat (WS Brussels)
  Amadou Ti (WS Brussels)
  Théo Di Rosa (WS Brussels)
  Karim El Hany (WS Brussels)
  Samuel Fabris (WS Brussels)
  Jérémy Obin (WS Brussels)
  Noël Soumah (WS Brussels)

1 Own goal (14 players)

  Jonas De Roeck (Antwerp, scored for Eupen)
  Mathias Lievens (Aalst, scored for Eupen)
  Wesley Vanbelle (Aalst, scored for Virton)
  Gertjan Martens (Antwerp, scored for Mons)
  Yannis Augustijnen (ASV Geel, scored for Sint-Truiden)
  Kurt Remen (Dessel Sport, scored for Patro Eisden Maasmechelen)
  Jan Van den Bergh (Heist, scored for Seraing United)
  Jeroen Vanderputte (Heist, scored for Virton)
  Jentle Gaethofs (Patro Eisden Maasmechelen, scored for Lommel United)
  David Vandenbroeck (OH Leuven, scored for Virton)
  Tom Raes (Roeselare, scored for Heist)
  Yoann Grosperrin (Tubize, scored for WS Brussels)
  Thomas Regnier (Woluwe-Zaventem, scored for Eupen)
  Habib Bellaïd (WS Brussels, scored for Eendracht Aalst)

Hat-tricks

References

Belgian Second Division seasons
Bel
2014–15 in Belgian football